British loyalist may refer to:

Loyalist (American Revolution)
Ulster loyalism